Spodolepis substriataria is a moth of the family Geometridae first described by George Duryea Hulst in 1896. It is found from Alaska to Nova Scotia, south in the east to New Jersey and in the west to California.

The wingspan is 40–45 mm. The forewings are light gray with black speckling, often with shades of brown along the costa and apex. Adults are on wing from April to June in one generation per year.

The larvae feed on Pseudotsuga, Pinus, Populus and Salix species. They are dark with an intricate pattern of black and brown, resembling tree bark or a twig. The species overwinters in the pupal stage within a cocoon in leaf litter.

Subspecies
Spodolepis substriataria substriataria
Spodolepis substriataria danbyi (Hulst, 1898)

References

External links

Oenochrominae
Monotypic moth genera
Moths of North America